Millennium Global International School is a private, mixed day school located on Peponi Rise, off Peponi Road, in Kitusuru, Westlands, Nairobi, Kenya.

The school offers the Edexcel British Curriculum from Pre Primary, Primary and Secondary (IGCSE and A Levels) in a serene, conducive environment.

See also

 Education in Kenya
 List of schools in Kenya

References

External links
 , the school's official website

Educational institutions with year of establishment missing
Private schools in Kenya
Schools in Nairobi
High schools and secondary schools in Kenya
Elementary and primary schools in Kenya